Luther Franklin McKinney (April 25, 1841 – July 30, 1922) was a U.S. Representative from New Hampshire.

Born in Newark, Ohio, McKinney attended common and private schools. He taught school for a while. When the Civil War began, he enlisted in Company D, 1st Ohio Cavalry Regiment, serving from August 5, 1861, until February 1863, where he became a sergeant. He moved to Iowa in 1865, where he engaged in agricultural pursuits and also taught school until 1867.

He graduated from St. Lawrence University, Canton, New York, June 30, 1870, and moved to Bridgton, Maine, in 1871, where he was ordained a pastor of the Universalist Church. He moved to Newfields, New Hampshire, in 1873, and subsequently, in 1875, to Manchester, pursuing his ministerial duties in both places. He was an unsuccessful candidate for election in 1884 to the Forty-ninth Congress.

McKinney was elected as a Democrat to the Fiftieth Congress (March 4, 1887 – March 3, 1889). He was an unsuccessful candidate for reelection in 1888 to the Fifty-first Congress. He was elected to the Fifty-second Congress (March 4, 1891 – March 3, 1893), but was not a candidate for renomination in 1892, when instead he was an unsuccessful candidate for Governor of New Hampshire.

He was the United States Minister to Colombia from 1893 to 1897, then returned to Bridgton, Maine, where he engaged in the furniture business. He served as member of the State house of representatives in 1907 and 1908. He was again pastor of the Universalist Church at Bridgton, where he served until his death on July 30, 1922. He was interred in Forest Hill Cemetery.

References

1841 births
1922 deaths
Politicians from Newark, Ohio
St. Lawrence University alumni
People from Bridgton, Maine
Ambassadors of the United States to Colombia
Democratic Party members of the Maine House of Representatives
People of New Hampshire in the American Civil War
Union Army non-commissioned officers
Democratic Party members of the United States House of Representatives from New Hampshire